The Elm Street Fire Station is a historic fire station in Gardner, Massachusetts.  Built in 1897, it is a little-altered example of a Late Victorian fire station, with a number of distinctive period features.  The station was listed on the National Register of Historic Places in 1980, at which time it was still in active service. It was included in the Gardner Uptown Historic District in 1999.  The building is presently vacant.

Description and history
The Elm Street Fire Station stands in a residential area east of downtown Gardner, at the northeast corner of Elm and Cherry Streets.  It is a 2-1/2 story brick building, with hip roof.  At its left front corner, a square tower rises four stories, with an open belfry at the top and a pyramidal roof with flared eaves.  The front facade houses three equipment bays on the ground floor, each with original double-leaf glazed wooden doors set in segmented-arch openings.  The second floor has bands of three windows set above each bay, with stone sills and segmented-arch headers.  The main roof eave is lined with modillion blocks.

When it was built in 1897, the building had a number of innovative features. It used a distinctive suspension system to support the building's second story without the need for columns, using steel rods attached to the load bearing outside walls.  Other interior facilities include systems for automatically dropping harnesses onto waiting horses, which were at the time the means by which fire equipment was moved.

See also
National Register of Historic Places listings in Worcester County, Massachusetts

References

External links

Fire stations completed in 1897
Towers completed in 1897
Fire stations on the National Register of Historic Places in Massachusetts
Buildings and structures in Gardner, Massachusetts
National Register of Historic Places in Worcester County, Massachusetts
Individually listed contributing properties to historic districts on the National Register in Massachusetts